The Mercedes-Benz Citan is a panel van and leisure activity vehicle introduced as a badge-engineered variant of the Renault Kangoo in 2012 and marketed by Mercedes-Benz as the successor to the Vaneo compact MPV. In the Mercedes-Benz van lineup, the Citan is the smallest model offered, alongside the mid-size Vito (aka Viano, V-Class, and EQV) and large Sprinter.


First generation (W415; 2012)

Production

The Citan, internally designated as the W415, is a result of the partnership between Daimler and the Renault-Nissan-Mitsubishi Alliance and is assembled by Renault subsidiary MCA in the northern French town of Maubeuge, alongside its twin, the Renault Kangoo.

The van is aimed at both the passenger car and light commercial vehicle markets and is the first Mercedes-Benz to be launched into the commercial vehicle market since the Vito in 1995. Daimler claim the leisure activity vehicle sector is the fastest-growing market area in Europe, accounting for 700,000 sales annually.

Bodystyles

The Citan is available in three different lengths: compact (3.94m), long (4.32m) and extra-long (4.71m). The vehicle comes in three bodystyles: Panel Van, Dualiner and Traveliner, with the Panel Van seating up to two people and both the Dualiner and Traveliner seating up to five.

Safety

The Citan Traveliner received four passenger stars in the Euro NCAP safety tests. The Mercedes-Benz CITAN Kombi was first tested by Euro NCAP in April 2013, and was given a three star rating. Mercedes-Benz indicated at that time that they would improve the safety performance of the vehicle, especially the deployment of the side airbag and the installation of child restraints; and that they would provide a seatbelt reminder for the front passenger seat and make the speed limitation device comply with Euro NCAP's requirements. These changes are now in production and Euro NCAP has reassessed the vehicle. Several tests have been redone to assess the changes that Mercedes-Benz have made. Where the performance is not influenced by the changes, test results have been carried over from the original assessment.

Marketing
In 2012, Mercedes-Benz began a marketing campaign for the Citan with Richard Dean Anderson reprising his role as the popular TV show character MacGyver. The series of short films, titled MacGyver and the New Citan, is available on the official Citan website, from 18 September. The episodes were shot in Johannesburg, South Africa, in July 2012.

Engines list

Second generation (W420; 2021) 

The second generation Citan was introduced in August 2021 in Panel Van and Tourer variants. Based on the third generation Renault Kangoo, the Citan (W420) rides on the CMF-CD platform, which also was developed into the T-Class MPV, replacing the existing Citan Traveliner and Citan Tourer.

The T-Class was released in April 2022, initially as the regular wheelbase version with seats for five people. A long-wheelbase variant with seats for seven in three rows is planned.

Electric models

eCitan
The Mercedes-Benz eCitan is a battery-electric variant of the Citan LCV, announced in October 2021 alongside the regular Citan, with availability beginning the second half of 2022. The estimated range is  under the WLTP combined driving cycle. The standard on-board charger has a capacity of 11 kW (AC), but as an option, a 22 kW (AC) / 75 kW (DC) charger can be ordered, which gives the vehicle a CCS Combo 2 port.

EQT

The Mercedes-Benz EQT is a battery-electric variant of the T-Class MPV, first shown as a concept at IAA 2021.

The production EQT was unveiled in December 2022, equipped with a drivetrain identical to that of the contemporary Kangoo E-Tech. It was introduced initially in the short-wheelbase version.

Engines

References

External links 

Citan
Vans
Electric vans
Mini MPVs
Front-wheel-drive vehicles
Euro NCAP small MPVs
Cars of Germany
Cars introduced in 2012
2020s cars